Christelijke Sportvereniging Apeldoorn is a football club from Apeldoorn, Netherlands. The club was founded in 1946. The first team plays in the Vierde Divisie Saturday (4th division) since 2022, when a championship in the Eerste klasse meant promotion.

History
In 2010 CSV Apeldoorn was promoted to the Topklasse by ranking third in the Hoofdklasse that year. It was relegated a year later back to the Hoofdklasse.

CSV Apeldoorn twice qualified for the main Dutch Cup. In season 2010–11, after receiving a bye in the first round CSV Apeldoorn lost 0–1 in the second round against VV Gemert. In season 2017-18 CSV Apeldoorn lost 2–4 in the first round against Willem II

Honours

Championships
 Vierde Klasse: 1952, 1971, 1979
 Derde Klasse: 1993
 Tweede Klasse: 1997
 Eerste Klasse: 2002, 2009, 2022

Cup
 KNVB District Cup (East): 2017 (1 of 6 regional amateur cup competitions)

League results

x = seasons cancelled due to COVID-19

Affiliation
CSV Apeldoorn was affiliated with Eredivisie-side PEC Zwolle. The purpose was to provide talented youth players optimal opportunities to develop. In September 2022, the club switched this form of partnership to 2 different clubs who both play in the Eredivisie, namely Vitesse and Go Ahead Eagles.

References

External links
 CSV Apeldoorn website

Football clubs in the Netherlands
Association football clubs established in 1946
1946 establishments in the Netherlands
Football clubs in Apeldoorn